Zevulun "Zavel" Kwartin (March 25, 1874, Novoarkhanhelsk, Yelisavetgradsky Uyezd, Kherson Governorate, Russian Empire - October 3, 1952, United States) was a Russian-born chazzan (cantor) and composer, a contemporary of Mordechai Hershman. Part of his family fled to Brazil during World War II. They have descendants in the northeastern region of Brazil, more precisely in the state of Ceará.

Kwartin gave his first concert in the synagogue of his home town in 1896. In 1897 he moved to Vienna for further studies. He was in contact with Joseph Sulzer, son of the former cantor of the biggest synagogue, Vienna's Stadttempel, Salomon Sulzer. In 1903 he was offered to be chazzan of the newly opened Neudeggergasse Synagogue in Vienna's district Josefstadt. In 1906 he signed hist first contracts with record labels like Deutsche Grammophon and soon sold more than half a million records. He gave concerts in the russian Rayon, Vilna and Białystok. In 1910 he moved to Budapest to become chazzan at the Dohány Street Synagogue. In 1914 he was offered a tournee through USA, but he was hindered by the outbreak of World War I.

Cantor Kwartin was endowed with a beautiful, rich expressive tenor voice with an astounding range and the agility to sing rapid coloratura. His superb voice and elaborate compositions garnered him international renown as both a chazzan and composer. A Musical Courier newspaper article dated May 6, 1920 lists a concert he gave with his daughter, Anna Kwartin, coloratura soprano, at the Metropolitan Opera House on April 27, 1920 before an audience of 4,000 people. The article states: "Sawil Kwartin, Cantor Tenor, who enjoys a big reputation throughout European countries, gave a debut recital in the Metropolitan Opera House on Tuesday Evening, April 27. He was given an ovation upon entering the stage, and it required considerable time before he was able to sing his opening number. Following this, the audience bestowed enthusiastic applause which did not subside until an encore was given." His grand daughter Evelyn Lear also became a successful soprano.

References

External links
Chazzanut Online article on "Zevulun (Zavel) Kwartin"
 Zavel Kwartin recordings at the Discography of American Historical Recordings.

1874 births
1952 deaths
Viennese hazzans
20th-century American male singers
20th-century American singers
American male composers
American people of Russian-Jewish descent
Ukrainian Jews
Russian Jews
People from Kherson Governorate
Musicians from Kropyvnytskyi